Vyacheslav Mikhailovich Lebedev (born 14 August 1943) is a Russian lawyer and jurist who has been serving as the Chief Justice of the Russian Federation since 1991.

Early life and education
Lebedev was born on 14 August 1943 in Moscow and attended the Lomonosov Moscow State University, which he graduated in 1968.

Career

Rise in the Communist Party
Lebedev began work in 1969 as a human resources functionary of a department of the Ministry of Industrial Construction of the USSR.
In 1970, he was elected as a Judge of the People’s District Court for Leningradskiy District in Moscow, and in 1977 he was appointed president of the People’s District Court for Zheleznodorozhniy District in Moscow.
He became deputy president of Moscow City Court in 1984, assuming the position of the court’s president in 1986.

References

1943 births
Living people
Russian jurists
Russian judges
Russian nationalists
Anti-Ukrainian sentiment in Russia
Chief Justices of Russia
Full Cavaliers of the Order "For Merit to the Fatherland"